Four ships of the Royal Navy have been named HMS Hermione after Hermione, the daughter of Menelaus and Helen in Greek mythology. 

  was a 32-gun fifth rate launched in 1782. Her crew mutinied in 1797 and handed her to the Spanish in La Guaira. She was recaptured in Puerto Cabello (1799), renamed HMS Retaliation, and renamed again to HMS Retribution in 1800. She was broken up in 1805.
  was an  protected cruiser launched in 1893. She served in the First World War and was sold in 1921.
  was a  light cruiser, launched in 1939. She was sunk in the Mediterranean by the German submarine  in 1942.
  was a  launched in 1967 and scrapped in 1997.

References

Royal Navy ship names